is a former Japanese football player and manager. who is becoming the head coach of the Myanmar national football team.

Playing career
Shibuya born in Muroran in 1966. After graduating from high school, he joined Furukawa Electric (later JEF United Ichihara) in 1985. The club won the champions 1985–86 Japan Soccer League and 1986 JSL Cup. In Asia, the club won the champions 1986 Asian Club Championship. This is first Asian champions as Japanese club. In 1992, he moved to PJM Futures (later Tosu Futures). In 1995, he moved to NTT Kanto (later Omiya Ardija). He retired in 1997.

Coaching career
After retiring, Shibuya spent his whole coaching career with Omiya Ardija, first as youth squad's coach and then as assistant coach. On the verge of relegation, he was appointed in August 2014. Despite relegation, he was confirmed for guiding the team in its first season in J2 after 10 years of J.League.

On 28 May 2017, with a record of only 2 wins in 13 league matches, and a 6 match losing streak, he was sacked by the club.

On 14 December 2017, Shibuya was named manager of Japanese club J2 League club Roasso Kumamoto for the 2018 season. However Roasso finished at the 21st place of 22 clubs in 2018 season and was relegated to J3 League.

Managerial statistics

References

External links

1966 births
Living people
Association football people from Hokkaido
Japanese footballers
Japan Soccer League players
J1 League players
Japan Football League (1992–1998) players
JEF United Chiba players
Sagan Tosu players
Omiya Ardija players
Japanese football managers
J1 League managers
J2 League managers
J3 League managers
Omiya Ardija managers
Roasso Kumamoto managers
Júbilo Iwata managers
Association football defenders
People from Muroran, Hokkaido